Jan Thompson  (born 25 August 1965 in Bexleyheath) is a British diplomat. She served as British Ambassador to the Czech Republic from 2013 to 2017.

Career 
Thompson attended Durham University where she studied French and German. She spent two years working for the BBC and then joined the Foreign and Commonwealth Office in 1990.

She is the current acting British High Commissioner to India.

Thompson was appointed Companion of the Order of St Michael and St George (CMG) in the 2021 New Year Honours for services to British foreign policy.

References

1965 births
Living people
Members of HM Diplomatic Service
Alumni of Collingwood College, Durham
Ambassadors of the United Kingdom to the Czech Republic
Companions of the Order of St Michael and St George
Officers of the Order of the British Empire
20th-century British diplomats
21st-century British diplomats